Grandmama is a fictional character in the Addams Family television and film series. First appearing in the works of cartoonist Charles Addams, she is a supporting character in the film, television, and stage adaptations.

Character background
Grandmama Addams is an aged witch who concocts potions and spells, and dabbles in fortune telling and knife throwing. She is the grandmother of the Addams children, Pugsley and Wednesday, although her relationship to the other family members is less consistent. Grandmama first appeared along with the then-unnamed Addams family in Charles Addams' original cartoons published in The New Yorker, in which she was regularly illustrated with shoulder-length frizzy hair and a fringed shawl. Addams described Grandmama in a 1963 character synopsis as "a disrespectful old hag" and "foolishly good-natured ... a weak character [who] is easily led."

Grandmama and Granny Frump
In Charles Addams' original The New Yorker cartoon strips, the character was referred to as Grandma Frump, therefore making her Morticia's mother. 

For the original television series, her relationship to the family is retconned and she becomes Gomez's mother with a different Granny Frump remaining as Morticia and her sister Ophelia’s mother. Granny Frump was also given a first name, which was Hester. These versions of the characters were also used in the Halloween with the New Addams Family, TV movie.

However, both the feature films and animated television series conform to Charles Addams' original concept of Grandmama as Wednesday's and Pugsley's maternal grandmother. In the first film, Morticia and Fester discuss how "Mother and Father Addams" were killed by an angry mob, removing any possibility that Grandmama could be Gomez and Fester's mother. In the third film, in which she is named Esmeralda, she is again implied to come from Morticia's family. The character is simply referred to as Granny in the two animated series. In the 1992 series, Grandmama is of Morticia's family, when she introduces herself with the line "the name's Granny Frump".

In the 1998-99 television series The New Addams Family, Grandmama appears once again as Gomez’s mother and for the first time as Fester’s mother. Granny Frump also appeared, once again as the mother of Morticia and Ophelia. Here, they’re both given names with Grandmama being named Eudora Addams and Granny Frump named Griselda Frump.

In the Broadway musical The Addams Family, Morticia refers to Grandmama as Gomez and Uncle Fester's mother, to which Gomez reacts with surprise and says that he thought she was Morticia's mother. Morticia later says that Grandmama "may not even be part of this family".

In the animated film and its sequel, she is Gomez and Fester's mother while Granny Frump is long dead.

Appearances

Television and film
 The character was named "Grandmama" for the 1960s television series in order to avoid confusion with Granny from The Beverly Hillbillies. She was played by Blossom Rock, who won the role over actresses such as Minerva Urecal and Marjorie Bennett, while Alice Pearce had been rejected after the producers deemed her too young for the part. She is depicted as being good friends with Morticia's mother Granny Frump (portrayed by Margaret Hamilton) who is also the mother of Morticia's sister Ophelia.
 Granny Frump appears in The New Scooby-Doo Movies episode "Wednesday is Missing" voiced by Janet Waldo.
 Janet Waldo also voiced Granny Frump in the 1973 animated series.
 Due to illness, Rock was the one regular cast member from the show who did not return for the 1977 reunion film Halloween with the New Addams Family, and she was replaced as Grandmama by Jane Rose. Granny Frump was also present helping with the Addams Family's Halloween party where she was portrayed by Elvia Allman.
 Carol Channing provided Granny Frump's voice for the 1992 animated series. In this show, she is shown to run a psychic hotline.
 Three different actresses played Granny in the three Addams Family feature films. Judith Malina appeared in the 1991 film The Addams Family, and was replaced by Carol Kane for the 1993 sequel Addams Family Values. For the 1998 direct-to-video picture Addams Family Reunion, Granny Frump was played by Alice Ghostley.
 Grandmama was played by Betty Phillips in the 1998-99 television series The New Addams Family. Like the original series, Grandmama is good friends with Granny Frump (portrayed by Meredith Bain Woodward).
 Bette Midler voiced the character in the 2019 computer-animated film. She is shown to be Gomez's and Fester's mother. When she arrives at the Addams Family house before the Saber Mazurka following her robbery in Spain, she treats Pugsley to the candy that is on her feet. At one point, Grandmama called Lurch by the name of "Fabio". Grandmama is also revealed to have a dwarfish sister named Sloom (voiced by Jenifer Lewis) who oversees Pugsley's Saber Mazurka and had an argument with her which Grandmama claimed that she won.
 Granny Frump is also in the film voiced by Catherine O'Hara. She and her husband Grandpa Frump (voiced by Martin Short) are long dead and Morticia holds a séance in the family cemetery to speak to them. It is also shown at the beginning of the film that Morticia possesses urns containing their ashes. When Morticia brings up Wednesday's friendship with Parker Needler, Granny and Grandpa Frump offer their advice to her and also bring up the time when Morticia ran away to join the girl scouts and learned that they roasted marshmallows and not girl scouts. At one point, Grandpa Frump forgot when he died to which Granny Frump stated that he died 20 years ago.
 Grandmama Addams appears in The Addams Family 2 voiced again by Bette Midler. While most of the Addams Family went on a cross-country road trip, Grandmama kept an eye on the house and threw a house party. When it got out of control, Grandmama called Cousin Itt to help get it back under control. By the time the Addams Family returned to their house, Grandmama and Cousin Itt had restored the house back to what it was before the party.

In other media
 In the 1989 Nintendo Entertainment System game Fester's Quest, the instruction booklet says Grandmama's psychic powers foretold the alien invasion that would come and abduct all the people in the city, so she invokes a curse on the family mansion. As a result, when extraterrestrial scouts scan the Addams residence for life forms they find none, thanks to Grandmama's curse.
 Grandmama was played by Jackie Hoffman in the 2010 Broadway musical, in which her relation to the family in the storyline is ambiguous. In Act Two, Morticia tells Gomez that "[his] mother came to our home and now she's here forever" to which he replies "wait, I thought she was your mother", referencing Grandmama's ever changing relation to the family in the franchise. Morticia later says that Grandmama "may not even be part of this family".

Relationships

Family tree

References 

Comics characters introduced in 1938
Comics characters who use magic
The Addams Family characters
Fictional fortune tellers
Female characters in comics
Female characters in film
Female characters in television
Fictional witches